Carl Ulf Sture Lundström (born 13 April 1960 in Filipstad, Sweden) is a Swedish businessman.

Carl Lundström is the son of Ulf Lundström and the grandson of Karl Edvard Lundström, founder of the world's largest crisp bread producer Wasabröd. When his father Ulf Lundström died in 1973, Carl Lundström was one of five heirs to Wasabröd. In 1982 Wasabröd was sold to the Swiss pharmaceutical company Sandoz. Lundström has founded and financed a number of companies, notably Swedish telecom, internet and co-location provider Rix Telecom.

Political affiliations
Lundström has been involved with various far-right political organisations in Sweden.

In 1991, Lundström financed the Swedish Progress Party, which later merged with the party Sweden Democrats.

In 2001, the Swedish National Democrats party publicized having received a donation of SEK 5000 from Lundström.

In 2005, Lundström took part in an oppositional group within the Swedish Taxpayers' Association, protesting the association's passive stance on the issue of costs for immigration.

The Pirate Bay trial

In 2003–2005, Lundström's company Rix Telecom provided services and equipment to torrent tracker The Pirate Bay. Lundström was one of the four defendants in The Pirate Bay trial charged with "accessory to breaching copyright law". On 17 April 2009 Stockholm district court found all defendants guilty and sentenced them to one year in prison and to jointly pay 30 million SEK (app. €2.7 million or US$3.5 million) in damages. The verdict was appealed. The appeal was a partial success, as his sentence was reduced to four months, but the fine was increased to 32 million SEK. The time in prison has been served.

References

1960 births
Living people
People from Filipstad
Swedish businesspeople
The Pirate Bay
Alternative for Sweden politicians